Jöhstadt is a town in the district of Erzgebirgskreis, in Saxony, Germany. It is situated in the Ore Mountains, on the border with the Czech Republic, 10 km southeast of Annaberg-Buchholz, and 35 km northeast of Karlovy Vary.

History 
From 1952 to 1990, Jöhstadt was part of the Bezirk Karl-Marx-Stadt of East Germany.

References 

Czech Republic–Germany border crossings
Erzgebirgskreis